Cortinarius austrovenetus, alternately known as Dermocybe austroveneta and commonly known as the green skin-head but also known as green dermocybe is an inedible brightly coloured green gilled fungus that naturally occurs in south eastern Australia.

Taxonomy
Initially described as Cortinarius austrovenetus by Australian naturalist John Burton Cleland in 1928, this mushroom along with many other members of the group was separated from the huge genus Cortinarius, and placed in the newer genus Dermocybe, commonly called skin-heads, derived from the meaning of their scientific names. However, this genus is often treated as a subgenus of Cortinarius only.

In 2007, Bruno Gasparini suggested that C. austrovenetus is the same species as another Cortinarius in subgenus Dermocybe, C. walkerae. If this is true, C. austrovenetus is a later synonym and the name C. walkerae would take precedence.

Description
The pigment has been isolated and described as austrovenetin. They have yellowy brown; adnate gills underneath the cap.

Like most members of the family Cortinariaceae this mushroom has a thin web-like veil (the cortina) protecting the gills in the early stages of growth. Remnants of this veil may be seen (often quite fleetingly) on the mature stipe.

Distribution and habitat
Occurring particularly in Victoria and Tasmania and typically in eucalypt forests or woodlands. It may exist in some numbers in New South Wales, South Australia and other eastern Australian states but little research has been conducted.

Edibility
The edibility of this mushroom is unknown, and it should be avoided, as some of its close relatives contain lethal toxins.

References

Dermocybe austroveneta

Fungi described in 1928
Fungi native to Australia
austrovenetus